Charles Bunbury may refer to:

Sir Charles Bunbury, 4th Baronet (1708–1742), MP
Sir Charles Bunbury, 6th Baronet (1740–1821), MP
Sir Charles James Fox Bunbury, 8th Baronet (1809–1886)
Sir Charles Henry Napier Bunbury, 11th Baronet (1886–1963) of the Bunbury baronets